Lists of armies include:

 List of armies by country
 List of numbered armies
 List of formations of the United States Army
 List of British armies in World War I
 List of French armies in World War I
 List of Russian armies in World War I
 German Army (German Empire)#Army inspectorate
 List of Soviet armies
 List of Italian armies in World War I
 Armies of the Imperial Japanese Army
 List of British armies in World War II
 List of Polish armies in World War II

Armies